Eleven ships of the Royal Navy have borne the name HMS Vanguard, meaning the forefront of an action or movement:
  was a 31-gun galleon launched in 1586, rebuilt twice and was broken up in 1630, with some parts being reused in the next HMS Vanguard.
  was a 56-gun second rate launched in 1631, active in the Anglo-Dutch Wars, and scuttled in 1667.
  was a 90-gun three-decker second-rate launched in 1678, sunk in 1703 but raised in 1704, rebuilt twice and renamed HMS Duke in 1728. She was broken up in 1769.
  was a 70-gun third rate launched in 1748 and sold in 1774.
  was a 4-gun gunvessel captured in 1780, purchased in 1781 and sold in 1783.
  was a 74-gun third rate launched in 1787. She became a prison ship in 1812, a powder hulk in 1814 and was broken up in 1821.
  was a 78-gun third rate launched in 1835, renamed HMS Ajax in 1867, and broken up in 1875.
  was a  battleship launched in 1909 and sunk in an explosion in 1917.
  was a unique battleship, the only one of her class. She was launched in 1944 and broken up in 1960.
  is a  ballistic missile submarine launched in 1992 and currently in service.

Battle honours

Armada, 1588
Cadiz, 1596
Portland, 1653
Gabbard, 1653
Scheveningen, 1653
Lowestoft, 1665
Four Days' Battle, 1666
Orfordness, 1666
Barfleur, 1692
Louisburg, 1758
Quebec, 1759
Martinique, 1762
Nile, 1798
Syria, 1840
Jutland, 1916

See also
 Vanguard class for ship classes
 Vanguard (disambiguation)

Royal Navy ship names